Dannette Latonia Millbrook and Jeannette Latrice Millbrook are fraternal twins from Augusta, Georgia, United States who disappeared on March 18, 1990 when they were 15 years old. Their surname is often misspelled as "Millbrooks" and Jeannette's middle name is often given as "Latressa" due to errors on police reports. The twins were last known to have been seen by a gas station clerk at the Pump-N-Shop gas station on the corner of 12th Street and Martin Luther King Jr. Boulevard around 4:30 pm. Their case was closed in 1991 and was reopened in 2013.

Disappearance 
On March 18, 1990, Dannette and Jeannette Millbrook walked to the local Church's Chicken restaurant for lunch. When they returned, they informed their mother, Louise, that a man in a van had followed them for part of their walk. Nothing further is known about this man.

Later in the day, the twins walked to their godfather's house to borrow money for a city bus to school the following week, as the teens and their family had recently moved to a new apartment further from their school. After receiving the $20 for bus fare and a little extra for snacks, the teens went to their cousin's house and asked her to walk home with them. The cousin's mother would not allow her to accompany the twins because it would be dark soon. After visiting their cousin, they made a stop at their older sister's home and stayed for approximately fifteen minutes. They also requested that their older sister walk with them, but she declined due to recently giving birth. After their disappearance, family members considered it unusual that the twins made multiple requests for company on the walk home that day.

Next, they continued on to a local gas station, where they bought chips, candy, and soda. The clerk, Gloria, was familiar with the twins. She did not recall anything out of the ordinary about their behavior. She is the last person to see Dannette and Jeannette.

Jeannette was last seen wearing a blue pullover shirt over a white turtleneck with a beige skirt, white stockings, and white sneakers. At the time of her disappearance, she was 5'4, and 125 lbs. Dannette was last seen wearing a white shirt with an image of Mickey Mouse, white jeans, and black shoes. At the time of her disappearance, she was 5'6 and 130 lbs. Dannette has been described as "bowlegged". Both girls had pierced ears, shoulder-length hair styled in Jheri curls, and they both have a scar near their navels from a surgery shortly after birth.

Dannette and Jeanette were enrolled as students at Lucy Laney High School. The twins were known to be good teens and were not troublemakers; they did not have a history of running away and there appears to be no motive for their disappearance. The twins did not have a history of misbehavior, outside of a single instance that occurred as a result of one of the twins being bullied at a bus stop.

Investigation

Original investigation 
After the girls were discovered missing, the family was told to wait 24-hours before making a report. Little is known about the initial investigation, as the original police file is reportedly lost. There is much debate as to why exactly the case was initially closed. The family reports that they were told the case was closed when the girls turned 17 because they had reached an age at which they could no longer be legally forced to come home if found. The original investigator claims that he was told by a juvenile case officer that the girls had been found, which led to both the case being closed and the girls’ removal from the national registry of missing children. Mistakes in reports from the original investigation, such as misspelling the last name as "Millbrooks" and listing Jeannette's middle name as "Latressa", have remained unchanged in case files and can still be found on associated databases today, such as The Charley Project and National Center for Missing and Exploited Children.

Reopened in 2013 
Despite the case being closed in 1991, family members continued to persistently contact the sheriff's department to inquire about the whereabouts of the twins over the years. The family was given several explanations for the closure of the case, including the explanation that the girls had been removed from the home and placed into foster care, where they were eventually adopted. Further investigation revealed this to be false. A close relative did have children in the foster care system, leading the family to believe that this was the source of the confusion. These calls ultimately led to the case being reopened in 2013. In media releases the sheriff was quoted as saying, “We think a terrible injustice has been done for the last 20 years” which helped to fuel interest in the new investigation. The current investigating agency is the Richmond County Sheriff's Office.

Although in 2017 the Sheriff's office met with the Millbrook family to discuss the case and collect familial DNA samples, as of 2019 it is unclear if the case is continuing to be investigated by local law enforcement.

Reward and billboard 
The producers of the podcast The Fall Line have taken an active role in the search for Dannette and Jeannette, and helped raise a $10,000 reward. A meeting with the sheriff's department led the Millbrook family to believe the reward would be officially announced and matched by the sheriff's department, but the sheriff's department denies making this commitment.

Concerned about the lack of publicity for the reward, the producers of The Fall Line and Unresolved podcasts worked together to raise money for a billboard to advertise the reward fund. , a little over $2,500 was raised and plans were in motion to create the billboard.

1993 Aiken County Jane Doe 
Skeletal remains of an unidentified black female were found in Aiken County on January 25, 1993 and were believed to be the result of a homicide occurring sometime between 1990 and 1992. The remains were found near Shaw's Creek off of Highway 191 in Aiken County, South Carolina. This woman remains unidentified and has become known as one of the Aiken County Jane Does. The family strongly believes that facial reconstructions of these remains resemble and could be Jeannette. When the remains were originally found, the family was told that it was not either of the twins. However, the family was not given a reason why. , the coroner's office reportedly has plans to compare DNA from the Aiken County Jane Doe to familial DNA.After the analysis it was discovered that the skeletal remains found did not belong to the twins.

Joseph Patrick Washington connection 
Joseph Patrick Washington was active in the girls' neighborhood and some believe that he may have been involved in the girls' disappearance. Washington was sentenced to 17 consecutive life sentences in 1995 for numerous criminal convictions associated with abductions and sexual assaults of 5 women, three of whom survived. He faced the death penalty in the murder of Marilyn Denise Kelly and was suspected in the murder of Loretta Dukes but died in 1999 before the trial started.

Family 
The twins’ mother is Mary “Louise” Sturgis. She has been very involved in trying to find her daughters. Sister to the twins, Shanta Sturgis, has also become a vocal advocate in the search for her sisters. Persistent calls to the sheriff's department from Shanta prompted the case to be reopened in 2013. Shanta has been very critical of both the initial and current investigations. Dannette and Jeannette have 8 siblings. This caused some confusion after their disappearance, as their sister was often mistaken as one of the twins.

In media

Podcasts 
The first season of The Fall Line podcast explores the details surrounding the disappearance of the Millbrook twins. The case of the twins’ disappearance has been discussed on several other podcasts including My Favorite Murder, Thin Air, The Trail Went Cold, Unresolved, and Crime Junkie.

† Briefly discussed The Fall Line podcast and the case, did not cover as a featured story.

Television 
Oxygen Media aired a two-hour television special on the case, which premiered on November 23, 2019.

See also 
List of people who disappeared

References 

1990 in Georgia (U.S. state)
1990s missing person cases
Augusta, Georgia
Missing American children
Missing person cases in Georgia (U.S. state)
Sisters
American twins